Room 112 is the second studio album by the American R&B quartet 112, released in 1998. The album features label mates Mase and Faith Evans; it also features Lil' Kim, Lil' Zane and MJG. The two singles, "Love Me", featuring Mase, and "Anywhere", featuring Lil' Zane, charted at number 17 and number 15 on the Billboard Hot 100, respectively.

Reception 

Entertainment Weekly wrote: "112 can't seem to decide whether they wanna woo the ladies or beat up on the competition. It's a choice that could make or break them in the future."

Track listing
Credits adapted from the album's liner notes.

Sample credits
 "Love Me" contains samples from "Don't You Know That?", written and performed by Luther Vandross.
 "Stay With Me" contains samples of "Sunny Came Home", written by Shawn Colvin and John Leventhal, and performed by Shawn Colvin.
 "Never Mind" contains samples of "8th Wonder", written by Clifton Chase, Cheryl Cook, Guy O'Brien, Sylvia Robinson and Michael Wright, and performed by Sugarhill Gang.

Personnel
Credits adapted from the album's liner notes.

 112 – vocals, arranger 
 "Prince Charles" Alexander – engineer , mixing 
 Dwayne Bastiany – producer 
 Scotty Beats – producer 
 Chris Blanding – engineer 
 Ali Boudris – engineer and guitar 
 Leslie Brathwaite – producer and engineer 
 Josh Butler – engineer 
 Sean "Puffy" Combs – producer , executive producer
 Zane Copeland, Jr. – rap 
 Lane Craven – mixing 
 Jerome Dale – producer 
 Stephen Dent – engineer 
 Faith Evans – producer and featured artist 
 Richard "Younglord" Frierson – producer 
 Rasheed Goodlowe – assistant engineer 
 Mick Guzauski – mixing 
 Femi Gya – engineer 
 Arnold Hennings – producer , all Indian instruments and keyboards 
 Anthony "Ty" Hudson – assistant engineer 
 J-Dub – producer , strings 
 Daron Jones – producer 
 Steven "Stevie J." Jordan – producer 
 Kris Kellow – producer, arranger, keyboards, and programming 
 Lil' Kim – featured artist 
 Ken Lewis – engineer 
 Paul Logus – mixing 
 Mario Luccy – engineer 
 Rico Lumpkins – engineer 
 Carlton Lynn – assistant engineer 
 Mase – featured artist 
 Tony Maserati – mixing 
 MJG – featured artist 
 Lynn Montrose – assistant engineer 
 Vernon J. Mungo – assistant engineer 
 Axel Niehaus – mixing 
 Jimmie Lee Patterson – assistant engineer 
 Michael Patterson – engineer , mixing 
 Joe Perrera – engineer , mixing 
 Rob Paustian – engineer 
 Herb Powers – mastering
 Ed Raso – engineer 
 Eric Roberson – arranger 
 Tom Russo – engineer 
 Tony Smalios – engineer 
 Brian Smith – engineer 
 Diane Warren – executive producer 
 Jason Webb – assistant engineer 
 Mike Wilson – engineer 
 Mario Winans – producer , overdubs

Charts

Weekly charts

Year-end charts

Certifications

Release history

References 

1998 albums
112 (band) albums
Bad Boy Records albums
Arista Records albums